Ray Boland (born November 21, 1937) is a former military officer and politician in Wisconsin.

Biography
Boland was born on November 21, 1937, in Chicago, Illinois. After graduating from Harper High School, Boland moved with his family to Friendship, Wisconsin in 1955. He is a graduate of Troy State University and Shippensburg University of Pennsylvania.

Boland and his wife, Donna, reside in Sparta, Wisconsin. They have six children and eleven grandchildren.

Military career
Boland joined the Wisconsin Army National Guard in 1956. He then began training at Fort Leonard Wood and Fort Sill. In 1959, Boland was commissioned an officer.

During the Berlin Crisis of 1961, Boland was assigned to the 32nd Infantry Division and stationed at Fort Lewis. In 1963, he was sent to Fort Rucker, where he began aviation training. After completing his training the following year, he was stationed in Hanau, Germany.

In 1966, Boland was deployed to serve in the Vietnam War. He flew the de Havilland Canada DHC-3 Otter in support of Special Forces operations. The following year, he returned to Fort Rucker to train future combat pilots. In 1969, Boland returned to Vietnam, assigned to the 101st Airborne Division. He assumed command of a Bell AH-1 Cobra unit. Afterwards, he again returned to Fort Rucker as an instructor.

After serving with the 1st Cavalry Division at Fort Hood, Boland attended the United States Army Command and General Staff College, graduating in 1975. In 1978, he became an aviation battalion commander with the 25th Infantry Division. He remained in that position until 1980, when he began attending the United States Army War College, graduating the following year. Afterwards, he was named Deputy Chief of Staff for Training of United States Army North. In 1985, Boland was assigned to the 3rd Infantry Division at Giebelstadt Army Airfield.

In 1988, Boland became garrison commander of Fort McCoy. During this time, he supported mobilization of units for deployment during the Gulf War. Boland retired in 1991 with the rank of colonel.

Awards he received during his career include the Legion of Merit, the Distinguished Flying Cross, Bronze Star Medal, the Purple Heart, the Meritorious Service Medal, the Air Medal, the Army Commendation Medal, Master Army Aviator Badge, the Presidential Unit Citation and the Vietnamese Gallantry Cross.

Political career
Boland served as secretary of the Wisconsin Department of Veterans Affairs from 1992 to 2003. In 2012, Boland was a candidate for the United States House of Representatives from Wisconsin's 3rd congressional district, losing to incumbent Ron Kind. Additionally, he has served as vice president of the National Coalition for Homeless Veterans.

Boland is a Republican.

References

1937 births
Living people
Politicians from Chicago
People from Friendship, Wisconsin
People from Sparta, Wisconsin
Wisconsin Republicans
Candidates in the 2012 United States elections
21st-century American politicians
Military personnel from Wisconsin
National Guard (United States) officers
Recipients of the Legion of Merit
Recipients of the Distinguished Flying Cross (United States)
Recipients of the Air Medal
Recipients of the Gallantry Cross (Vietnam)
United States Army personnel of the Vietnam War
United States Army personnel of the Gulf War
Aviators from Wisconsin
Troy University alumni
Shippensburg University of Pennsylvania alumni
United States Army Command and General Staff College alumni
United States Army War College alumni
United States Army colonels
American Master Army Aviators
Military personnel from Illinois